The Life Aquatic with Steve Zissou is a 2004 American adventure comedy-drama film written by Wes Anderson and Noah Baumbach and directed by Anderson. It is Anderson's fourth feature-length film and was released in the United States on December 25, 2004.

The film stars Bill Murray as Steve Zissou, an eccentric oceanographer who sets out to exact revenge on the "jaguar shark" that ate his partner Esteban. Zissou is both a parody of and homage to French diving pioneer Jacques Cousteau, to whom the film is dedicated.

The film also features Owen Wilson, Cate Blanchett, Willem Dafoe, Michael Gambon, Jeff Goldblum, Anjelica Huston and Bud Cort. Seu Jorge has a minor part, but contributes heavily to the film's soundtrack. It was filmed in and around Naples, Ponza, and the Italian Riviera.

The film was released to mixed reviews and was a box office flop. In the decade following its release it has garnered a cult following, and is now viewed more positively by both critics and fans. It was also since remastered and re-released by The Criterion Collection in 2014.

Plot
While oceanographer Steve Zissou is working on his latest documentary at sea, his best friend and chief diver, Esteban du Plantier, is devoured by a 10-meter-long, luminescently spotted creature Zissou describes as a "jaguar shark". For his next project, Zissou is determined to document the shark's destruction.

The crew aboard Zissou's aging research vessel Belafonte includes his estranged wife Eleanor, chief strategist and financial backer; Pelé dos Santos, a safety expert and Brazilian guitarist who sings David Bowie songs in Portuguese; and Klaus Daimler, the German first mate who views Zissou and Esteban as father figures. Minor crew members include Vikram Ray, cameraman; Bobby Ogata, frogman; Vladimir Wolodarsky, physicist and soundtrack composer; Renzo Pietro, sound man; and Anne-Marie Sakowitz, a script girl who is often seen topless. Also included is a recent group of unpaid interns from the University of North Alaska. However, the "Team Zissou" venture has hit a decline; they have not released a successful documentary in nine years.

Ned Plimpton is a longtime Zissou fan whose mother has recently died, who believes that Zissou is his father. After they meet at Zissou's latest premiere, Ned takes annual leave from his job as an airline pilot in Kentucky to join his crew. As Oseary Drakoulias, Zissou's producer, cannot find a financier for their latest documentary, Ned offers his inheritance. Eleanor feels her husband is exploiting Ned and leaves. 

A pregnant reporter, Jane Winslett-Richardson, comes to chronicle the voyage. Both Ned and Zissou are attracted to Jane, and a competition develops between them. Klaus becomes jealous of the attention Zissou pays to Ned.

On their mission to find the jaguar shark, the Belafonte steals tracking equipment from a remote station owned by currently more successful oceanographer (and Zissou's nemesis), Alistair Hennessey. They then sail into unprotected waters and are attacked by Filipino pirates, who steal Ned's money and kidnap Bill Ubell, a "bond company stooge" assigned to the project. They are then rescued by Hennessey and towed to Port-au-Patois. Sakowitz, along with all but one of the interns, jumps ship once they reach port.

Zissou persuades Eleanor to rejoin the Belafonte, and then leads the crew on a rescue mission. They track Bill to an abandoned hotel on a remote island, saving him along with Hennessey, whom the pirates have also kidnapped. Ned and Zissou then make one last search for the shark in the ship's helicopter, but the aircraft malfunctions and they crash. Ned dies from his injuries and is buried at sea. Prior to Ned's death, Eleanor revealed to Jane that Zissou is sterile; therefore Ned could not have been his son.

Zissou finally tracks down the shark in a submersible but decides not to kill it, both because of its beauty and not having any more dynamite. At the premiere of the finished documentary (which is dedicated to Ned who is acknowledged as Zissou's son), Zissou receives a standing ovation while waiting outside the theater for the premiere to finish. The crew returns triumphantly to the ship the next day.

Cast
 Bill Murray as Steve Zissou
 Owen Wilson as Edward 'Ned' Plimpton / Kingsley Zissou
 Cate Blanchett as Jane Winslett-Richardson
 Anjelica Huston as Eleanor Zissou
 Willem Dafoe as Klaus Daimler
 Jeff Goldblum as Alistair Hennessey
 Michael Gambon as Oseary Drakoulias
 Bud Cort as Bill Ubell, Bond Company Stooge
 Noah Taylor as Vladimir Wolodarsky
 Seu Jorge as Pelé dos Santos
 Robyn Cohen as Anne-Marie Sakowitz
 Waris Ahluwalia as Vikram Ray
 Niels Koizumi as Bobby Ogata
 Pawel Wdowczak as Renzo Pietro
 Matthew Gray Gubler as Niko, Intern (credited as Intern #1)
 Antonio Monda as Himself
 Isabella Blow as Antonia Cook
 Seymour Cassel as Esteban du Plantier

Production notes

Literary inspiration
Though the characters were inspired by such American novels as The Great Gatsby and The Magnificent Ambersons, the plot has been compared to Moby-Dick.

Writing about the metaphorical aspects of the film's setting—somewhere in the Mediterranean—film critic Elena Past says that the underwater scenes, because they are central to the storyline, make The Life Aquatic similar in some ways to Respiro. Both films set out a "Mediterranean state of being" where "having left the security of land, the characters in both films are suddenly confronted with the precarious nature of human existence, as the films that depict them tackle the challenges of representing the submarine world."

Casting

James Gray originally signed on to play Wolodarsky but he left when he learned that he was going to spend five months in Italy.

Exotic lifeforms
In addition to the luminescent-spotted jaguar shark, other fictional lifeforms (some stop-motion-animated) are cited and appear throughout the film, such as the rhinestone bluefin, crayon ponyfish, wild snow-mongoose, electric jellyfish, and sugar crabs. The animation work was done by Henry Selick.

Music 

The soundtrack to The Life Aquatic with Steve Zissou contains a style typical of other Wes Anderson films. Mark Mothersbaugh, a member of Devo, composed the score, as he has for many of Anderson's other films. The film also features many rock songs from the 1960s-1980s, and several instrumental pieces composed by Sven Libaek for the underwater documentary television series Inner Space. Additionally, the film and soundtrack feature Seu Jorge performing David Bowie songs in Portuguese on the acoustic guitar. Jorge, who also plays the character of Pelé dos Santos, performs some of these cover songs live, in character during the film, mostly with modified lyrics reflecting Jorge's own experiences working on the film. The ending scene depicting the beauty of the shark features the song "Starálfur" by Sigur Rós.

The Life Aquatic is Anderson's first film not to feature a Rolling Stones song.

Reception

Box office
The film grossed a total of $24,020,403 domestically after twelve weeks in release, less than half its $50 million production budget. It took in a further $10,788,000 internationally, bringing the total gross to $34,808,403.

Critical response  
Initial reviews of the film were mixed. The film has a 56% approval rating on Rotten Tomatoes, based on 224 reviews, with an average rating of 6.10/10; the website's consensus states: "Much like the titular oceanographer, The Life Aquatic with Steve Zissous overt irony may come off as smug and artificial – but for fans of Wes Anderson's unique brand of whimsy, it might be worth the dive." The film has a 62/100 weighted average score on Metacritic, indicating "generally favorable reviews". Audiences polled by CinemaScore gave the film an average grade of "D" on an A+ to F scale.

Anthony Lane, a film reviewer for The New Yorker, agreed with the conventional criticism of Anderson's deadpan style: that the underreaction of Anderson's characters used to be "hip" but has now become "frozen into a mannerism." He said that "some stretches of action" in the film are being "lightly held within quotation marks," with an "unmistakable air of playacting" in even the most violent scenes. He also criticized the film's deliberately "weird" set ups, which leave the viewer with "the impression of having nearly drowned in some secret and melancholy game."

In the years since its initial release it has developed a cult following, and it underwent a critical reevaluation. Many critics view it more favorably, and some, such as Mike D'Angelo of The A.V. Club, consider the film to still be "undervalued" when compared to the rest of Anderson's filmography.

Accolades

Home media
The DVD of the film was released by the Criterion Collection on May 10, 2005 as its 300th title, in both 1-disc version and a 2-disc versions. This is Anderson's third film to be released in the collection, after Rushmore and The Royal Tenenbaums. The Criterion Blu-ray was released on May 27, 2014.

References in popular culture 

 The name of Mexican rock band Belafonte Sensacional is inspired, in part, by this movie.
 Austin Tofte, of Swimming With Dolphins has listed this movie as his favorite film. 
 Epic Rap Battles of History released a rap battle between Jacques Cousteau and Steve Irwin. In one of Cousteau's flex bars, he references The Life Aquatic saying, "I'm so cool, Bill Murray played me in the movie."
 The Family Guy episode The Tan Aquatic with Steve Zissou'''s title is a reference to this movie.
The song Alan Forever on Lupe Fiasco’s album DROGAS WAVE imagines an alternate reality for Alan Kurdi in which he survived his emigration from Syria and “might be the next Steve Zissou or maybe Jacques Cousteau”

See also
 SAS Walvisbaai, the ship used as the R/V Belafonte Jaguar catshark, a species of shark named after the fictional shark featured in the film.

References

External links

 
 
 "Captain Neato" Christian Lorentzen's review of The Life Aquatic with Steve Zissou'' in n+1 (April 23, 2010)

2004 films
2000s adventure comedy-drama films
American adventure comedy-drama films
Films scored by Mark Mothersbaugh
Films about filmmaking
American films about revenge
Films about sharks
Films directed by Wes Anderson
Films produced by Barry Mendel
Films produced by Scott Rudin
Films set in Italy
Films set in the Mediterranean Sea
Films shot in Italy
Films shot in Naples
Films featuring underwater diving
Pirate films
Films with screenplays by Wes Anderson
Touchstone Pictures films
Films produced by Wes Anderson
Films à clef
2000s English-language films
2000s American films